Wróbel is a Polish surname literally meaning "sparrow".

Wróbel or Wrobel may also refer to:

Wróbel, Warmian-Masurian Voivodeship, village in northern Poland
Henryk Wróbel was the Polish nickname of Henry VIII the Sparrow
Wrobel Vroby 2, French powered parachute
ZU-23-2M "Wróbel", Polish naval version of ZU-23-2 anti-aircraft twin-barreled autocannon